Leccinum viscosum is a species of bolete fungus in the family Boletaceae. Found in Belize, where it grows in sandy soil near Pinus caribaea and Quercus peduncularis, it was described as new to science in 2009 by mycologists Roy Halling and Beatriz Ortiz. The bolete is classified in section Pseudoscabra of genus Leccinum.

See also
List of Leccinum species

References

viscosum
Fungi described in 2009
Fungi of Central America